“Rollout (My Business)” is a song by American rapper Ludacris. It was the second single released from his 2001 album Word of Mouf. The song, on whose writing and composition Ludacris collaborated with music-producer Timbaland, who also produced it, debuted at number 95 on the Billboard Hot 100 on November 10, 2001, reached the top 40 at number 34 on December 29, and peaked at number 17 on February 2, 2002. It was also nominated for the 2002 Grammy Award for Best Male Rap Solo Performance.

Music video

The official music video for the song was directed by Jeremy Rall.

Track listing
"Rollout (My Business)" (radio edit)
"Rollout (My Business)" (album version)
"Rollout (My Business)" (instrumental)

Charts

Weekly charts

Year-end charts

Certifications

References

2001 singles
2001 songs
Ludacris songs
Def Jam Recordings singles
Music videos directed by Jeremy Rall
Song recordings produced by Timbaland
Songs written by Ludacris
Songs written by Timbaland
Comedy rap songs